BBC First is a Dutch pay television channel dedicated to British television drama and crime series. It launched in the Netherlands on 16 May 2015 and in Belgium on 4 June 2015. The channel is distributed by BBC Benelux, a division of BBC Studios. It is the localised version of the internationally available BBC First, with Dutch subtitles, Dutch voice-overs between programmes and during commercial breaks, and localised advertisement. The programming consists not only of BBC productions, but also of productions of, among others, ITV.

History
BBC First launched in the Netherlands on 16 May 2015, initially exclusively on the KPN IPTV service (Interactieve TV van KPN) on channel 23. The programme mix is specifically for the Netherlands, with more emphasis placed on drama and crime series. All programming is subtitled in Dutch. KPN simultaneously withdrew BBC Three and BBC Four.

The channel launched in Belgium on 4 June 2015.

On 1 July 2016 Ziggo added BBC First to its channel line up.

See also
 BBC Studios
 International BBC television channels

References

External links
 

International BBC television channels
Television channels and stations established in 2015
Television channels in the Netherlands
Television channels in Belgium
Television channels in Flanders